Artocarpus blancoi is a species of plant in the family Moraceae endemic to the Philippines. Its habitat (among seasonal forest or thicket growth in low-lying areas) is threatened.

It is locally known as tipolo or antipolo by the Filipinos. Paper production and being a shade provider are its primary uses, although its seeds and fruits are edible. The City of Antipolo got its name from the said tree.

See also
Ginataang langka

References

blancoi
Vulnerable plants
Plants described in 1923
Flora of the Philippines
Endemic flora of the Philippines
Taxonomy articles created by Polbot